Kamaran (also Romanized as Kamarān) is a village in Ashayer Rural District, in the Central District of Fereydunshahr County, Isfahan Province, Iran. At the 2006 census, its population was 107, in 21 families.

References 

Populated places in Fereydunshahr County